Hardivillers-en-Vexin is a former commune in the Oise department in northern France. On 1 January 2019, it was merged into the new commune La Corne-en-Vexin.

See also
 Communes of the Oise department
 Vexin

References

Former communes of Oise
Populated places disestablished in 2019